The Red Paint People are a Pre-Columbian culture indigenous to the New England and Atlantic Canada regions of North America. They were named after their burials, which used large quantities of ochre, normally red, to cover both the bodies of the dead and grave goods.  Sometimes they are known as the  Moorehead Phase of the Laurentian Tradition or the Moorehead burial tradition after Warren K. Moorehead who brought them widely to the attention of scientists. They flourished between 3000 BCE and 1000 BCE. Alternatively, they can be called by the period in which they lived, either the "Maritime Archaic" (emphasizing a coastal and seafaring culture) or "Late Archaic" (emphasizing time and leaving open the possibility of living inland seasonally), although these terms often cover the longer period from 7000 BCE to 1000 CE. Multiple hypotheses exist as to which if any later peoples might be their descendants and there is little archaeological evidence to support any hypothesis.

Their burial culture was more elaborate than any subsequent culture in the area. In the southern portion of their range, they were succeeded by the Susquehana culture which used pottery, and no evidence of their stoneworking techniques is found in that culture.

Lifestyle and technology
The Red Paint People lived, fished, and hunted along the coasts and rivers. Some coastal sites show evidence of year-round occupation, discrediting an older theory that these people were seasonal nomads, living the summers on the coast and the winters inland. Their diet included sea and migratory fish, shellfish, meat, berries, acorns, nuts, and roots. The Red Paint People had stone and bone tools, as well as boats capable of catching swordfish. No pottery or metal tools have been found in sites associated with this culture. Their trading range is known to have extended from Labrador to the New York side of Lake Champlain.

Scientific investigation
The graves with red paint were known as early as the 1840s, but the first scientific examination was undertaken in 1892 by Charles Willoughby of the Peabody Museum of Archaeology and Ethnology at Harvard University. Willoughby exhibited a scale model of the dig at the World's Columbian Exposition in Chicago in 1893. It caught the attention of Moorehead, who carried out more excavations and published their site reports  from 1912 to the 1920s. He described the people as older than other cultures of the area. This was disputed until radiometric dating proved Moorehead correct . In the 1930s, one theory for their disappearance was that the Red Paint People had been killed by tsunamis caused by coastal subsidence. This is no longer believed .

See also
 Red Ocher people

References 

 
 
 
 
 
 

,

Pre-Columbian cultures
Archaic period in North America